Metallarcha diplochrysa, the golden metallarcha moth, is a moth in the family Crambidae. It was described by Edward Meyrick in 1884. It is found in Australia, where it has been recorded from South Australia.

References

Moths described in 1884
Spilomelinae